Kralji (in older sources also Kralje) is a small settlement in the Municipality of Kočevje in southern Slovenia. The area is part of the traditional region of Lower Carniola and is now included in the Southeast Slovenia Statistical Region.

Mass grave
Kralji is the site of a mass grave associated with the Second World War. It contains the remains of unidentified victims.

Church
The local church was a 17th-century pilgrimage church on a hill south of the settlement dedicated to the Prophet Elijah. It was burned down in a fire before the Second World War and was not rebuilt.

References

External links
Kralji on Geopedia

Populated places in the Municipality of Kočevje